Halldóra Tumadóttir (1180–1247), was a politically active Icelandic woman, spouse of Sighvatr Sturluson and sister of Kolbeinn Tumason; she became the mother of Sturla Sighvatsson. She is portrayed as a minor figure, but an important one, in the political wars and feuds on Iceland during the Age of the Sturlungs. Her marriage in 1215 was a political match which brought peace between her two families.

References

13th-century Icelandic people
1247 deaths
1180 births
Sturlungar family clan
12th-century Icelandic people
12th-century Icelandic women
13th-century Icelandic women